Bewketu Seyoum (Ge'ez: በዕውቀቱ ስዩም) is an Ethiopian writer and poet from Debre Markos of Ethiopia. He studied psychology at Addis Ababa University and published his first collection of poems, Nwari Alba Gojowoch (Unmanned Cottage) in 2000, a year after graduating. Since then, he has published two further poetry collections and two novels, and has narrated short stories on CD. In 2008, he received the best young writer award of Ethiopia from the President. Some of his poetry has appeared in Modern Poetry in Translation, The Big Green Issue (2008), and Callaloo (2011).

1. Works
 Newari Alba Gojowoch (Ge'ez: ኗሪ አልባ ጎጆዎች) (Unmanned Houses), 2000
 Berari  (Ge'ez: በራሪ ቅጠሎች) (Flying Leaves), 2004
 Yesat Dar Hasaboch (Ge'ez: የእሳት ዳር ሃሳቦች) (Fireside meditations), 2009
 In Search of Fat (Ge'ez: ሀሰሳ ስጋ), 2012
Enkilf ena Edme (Ge'ez: እንቅልፍ እና እድሜ)
 Megbat ena Mewtat (Ge'ez: መግባት እና መውጣት)
 Ke Amen Bashager (Ge'ez: ከአሜን ባሻገር), 2015
 Yemaleda Dibab (Ge'ez: የማለዳ ድባብ), 2017
 Adam-El (Ge'ez: አዳምኤል), 2020

2. Critical Responses 
Honored as Ethiopian Best Novelist of the Year in 2008 and Best Young Author in 2009, he is widely regarded as one of the leading poets of his generation and is well-known for his humor writing and comedic performance.

3. Personal Life 
Although Bewketu Seyoum was born into a religious family, he is often heard saying that he is a non-believer. Bewketu Seyoum is a vegetarian.

References 

Seyoum, Bewketu
Bewketu Seyoum biography, Modern Poetry in Translation magazine

Year of birth missing (living people)
21st-century poets
Ethiopian poets
Ethiopian novelists
Addis Ababa University alumni
21st-century novelists
Living people
People from Debre Markos